Louisiana Highway 27 (LA 27) is a state highway located in southwestern Louisiana. It runs  in a general north–south direction from LA 14 in Holmwood to the junction of U.S. Highways 171 and 190 in DeRidder.

The route travels in a mirror-image of the letter "J" as it loops through the wetlands surrounding Calcasieu Lake and passes through Cameron, a small community situated on the Gulf of Mexico. It then extends northward through Sulphur en route to its terminus in DeRidder.

LA 27 essentially functions as two north–south roadways connecting the sparsely populated Cameron Parish to the Lake Charles metropolitan area and is signed accordingly. The north–south directional banners are reversed at the Cameron Ferry, a toll ferry the crosses the Calcasieu Ship Channel.

Route description
LA 27 begins at a junction with LA 14 in Holmwood, a point in Calcasieu Parish. It heads due south and, after , provides access to the  Cameron Prairie National Wildlife Refuge.  Reaching a cross-roads at Creole, LA 27 turns west concurrent with LA 82, the only other major highway through Cameron Parish.

LA 27 and LA 82 parallel the coastline of the Gulf of Mexico into Cameron, the parish seat. Here, the route crosses the deep-water Calcasieu Ship Channel by way of a toll ferry. Continuing westward to Holly Beach, LA 27 turns northward away from LA 82 and meanders along the west side of Calcasieu Lake through Hackberry. Re-entering Calcasieu Parish, LA 27 overlaps LA 108 through unincorporated Carlyss, a residential area near the industrial section south of Sulphur. At a four-way intersection, LA 1256 continues straight ahead across I-10 and into Downtown Sulphur. LA 27 zigzags onto the parallel Beglis Parkway through a neighboring interchange with I-10, passing just east of the center of town.

Continuing northward, LA 27 passes through the small city of DeQuincy and intersects LA 12. LA 27 proceeds north into Beauregard Parish through Oretta and Singer before reaching its final destination of DeRidder. In the center of town, LA 27 terminates at a one-way pair that is shared by US 171 and US 190. From this junction, connections are made to such cities as Lake Charles, Baton Rouge, and Shreveport, as well as Fort Polk in Leesville.

Byway and memorial designations
The entirety of LA 27 from Holmwood to Sulphur serves as a major portion of the Creole Nature Trail, a National Scenic Byway and All-American Road.

In 2003, the portion of LA 27 from Sulphur to DeQuincy was designated as the Horace Lynn Jones Memorial Highway by the state legislature.

History

In the original Louisiana Highway system in use between 1921 and 1955, LA 27 served as a portion of State Route 42 and the entirety of State Route 104.  Both were designated by the state legislature during the 1920s.  In this system, the two highways running northward from Cameron on either side of Calcasieu Lake had different numbers. The westerly route from Cameron through Sulphur to DeRidder was Route 104, while the easterly route through Creole toward Lake Charles was the southern leg of Route 42, a much longer route that was co-signed with US 171 as far as Mansfield.

When the Louisiana Department of Highways renumbered the state highway system in 1955, lengthy concurrencies between U.S. and state routes were eliminated. Route 104 became LA 27, and the independent portion of former Route 42 southeast of Lake Charles was largely included in that designation, connected via a concurrency with LA 82 through Cameron.

As its official route description indicates, north of Holmwood, LA 27 also originally included a string of minor roads running north to Chloe, then east along what is now the I-10 service road through Iowa to LA 101 at Lacassine.  By the 1970s, this mileage was largely eliminated.  The only other realignment in LA 27 shifted the route onto a streamlined path through Sulphur in 1993. The original route initially became LA 27 Bus. but has since been renumbered to LA 1256 and partially eliminated from the state highway system.

Major intersections
Note: The route is entirely signed north–south. The directional banners are reversed at the Cameron Ferry.

Business route

Louisiana Highway 27 Business (LA 27 Bus.) ran  in a north–south direction from the junction of LA 27 and LA 108 in Carlyss to the junction of US 90 and LA 27 in Sulphur.  The route followed the original alignment of LA 27 through Sulphur. It was renumbered as LA 1256 in 2003, and since then, has been partially returned to local control.

See also

References

External links

Maps / GIS Data Homepage, Louisiana Department of Transportation and Development
Louisiana Scenic Byways Homepage

0027
Transportation in Beauregard Parish, Louisiana
Transportation in Calcasieu Parish, Louisiana
Transportation in Cameron Parish, Louisiana